The Ruhwa River (or Lua, Luha, Luhwa, Luwa, Ruwa) is a river in southwestern Rwanda that is a left-hand tributary of the Ruzizi River.  
The Ruhwa forms the boundary between the western regions of Rwanda and Burundi.

References
Citations

Sources

Rivers of Rwanda
Rivers of Burundi